Formed in 1938, 
Cobb Electric Membership Corporation, more commonly known as Cobb EMC, is a non-profit electric utility company serving parts of Cobb, Cherokee, Bartow, Paulding, and small sections of Fulton counties in Georgia. In 2009, it had total sales of over 3.8 billion kilowatt-hours (13.7 billion megajoules).

It was founded in 1938 with 489 residential members and 14 business accounts, and now serves about 200,000 homes and businesses (including over 180,000 in northwest metro Atlanta), making it one of the largest electric membership corporations in the state and country.  However, most residents in Cobb and other counties are customers of Georgia Power, while those within the city limits of Marietta (the Cobb county seat) are customers of Marietta Power, a municipal utility run by the city.

Cobb EMC participates in a rebate program for customers who install solar panels.  In January 2009, the company joined with Green Power EMC to buy 17 megawatts of electric power from a company which upgraded the power plant at the former Fruit of the Loom factory in Rabun Gap to use logging biomass as a fuel.

Cobb Energy
Cobb Energy Management Corporation, usually known as Cobb Energy, was created as a for-profit subsidiary in 1997.

It eventually sparked a lawsuit by Cobb EMC members, charging that their money was being funneled into the new company, after a 2007 exposé by the Atlanta Journal-Constitution.  Shareholders prevailed, and won again on appeal to the Georgia Court of Appeals in April 2010.  Cobb Energy was folded back into the non-profit cooperative. Co-op board elections, delayed by the litigation since 2007, were scheduled to resume in the fall of 2011.

In early January 2011, the CEO of Cobb EMC was arrested and charged with 31 counts of racketeering and theft after his indictment by a county grand jury in the matter, citing more than 50 million dollars taken from or not paid to the EMC by Cobb Energy.

Prior to these events, the company purchased naming rights to the new Cobb Energy Performing Arts Centre, which still bears the name.

Partners and Affiliates 
 ENERGY STAR
 Green Power EMC
 Gas South
 Touchstone Energy
 Georgia Electric Membership Corporation (Georgia EMC)

References

External links
Cobb EMC, official site
Cobb Energy, official site
Cobb EMC Truth, a watchdog group
Take Back Cobb EMC, a citizen action group
Gas South, a wholly owned subsidiary

Energy companies established in 1938
Cobb County, Georgia
Cherokee County, Georgia
Bartow County, Georgia
Paulding County, Georgia
Fulton County, Georgia
Calhoun County, Georgia
Clay County, Georgia
Quitman County, Georgia
Randolph County, Georgia
Electric power companies of the United States
1938 establishments in Georgia (U.S. state)